Matteo Piccinni (born 6 March 1986) is an Italian professional footballer who plays for Serie D club Franciacorta.

Biography
Born in Milan, Lombardy, Piccinni started his career at Lombard club Calcio Como. Piccinni joined Udinese Calcio after Como folded in 2005. Udinese also sold 50% registration rights of Piccinni to Empoli in January 2006 but bought back in June 2006. In 2006, he left for Pizzighettone. In 2007, he was signed by Massese. In 2008 Piccinni was signed by Serie B club Pisa Calcio.

In July 2009 he was signed by AlbinoLeffe in co-ownership deal for €150,000 in 4-year contract. In June 2010 AlbinoLeffe acquired the remain 50% registration rights for €1,000. Piccinni was a player for AlbinoLeffe in Serie B until relegation in 2012. On 20 August 2012 Piccinni left for Serie B club Calcio Padova with Adama Diakité moved to opposite direction. Circa 2012 Piccinni also extended his contract with AlbinoLeffe. After the expiry of his loan, Piccinni continued his AlbinoLeffe career in Lega Pro Prima Divisione.

On 2 August 2019, he signed a 1-year deal with Bisceglie. 

On 17 January 2020, he moved to Swiss club Chiasso until the end of the season.

References

External links
 
 AIC profile (data by football.it) 

Footballers from Milan
1986 births
Living people
Italian expatriate footballers
Italian footballers
Como 1907 players
Udinese Calcio players
A.S. Pizzighettone players
U.S. Massese 1919 players
Pisa S.C. players
U.C. AlbinoLeffe players
Calcio Padova players
Real Vicenza V.S. players
A.S. Gubbio 1910 players
A.S. Bisceglie Calcio 1913 players
FC Chiasso players
Serie B players
Serie C players
Swiss Challenge League players
Serie D players
Association football defenders
Italian expatriate sportspeople in Switzerland
Expatriate footballers in Switzerland